Bayut is a UAE-based property search engine for buying, selling and renting residential and commercial properties across the country's seven emirates. The website also provides users with a tool to calculate commute times from listed properties to destinations, and shows nearby schools, hospitals, and restaurants.

Bayut is part of the Emerging Markets Property Group that is responsible for Zameen.com in Pakistan, BProperty.com in Bangladesh, Mubawab in Morocco and Tunisia, and Kaidee in Thailand.

History 
Bayut was founded in 2008 by the Khan brothers Zeeshan, Imran, and Haider, following their launch of Zameen.com in Pakistan. The company started in a home in Northolt, London, with no physical presence in the UAE. The three brothers built the site, while retaining their daily jobs. In 2014, Haider quit his job and took over as the company CEO.

In February 2019, parent company EMPG closed its Series D round of funding, raising $100 million, led by KCK Group, a California-based investment company. The same year, Bayut acquired the Middle East assets of Rocket Internet’s Lamudi, which operated in the UAE, Saudi Arabia and Jordan, and itself expanded into Saudi Arabia.

In April 2019, Bayut launched authentication solution TruCheck at their inaugural real estate summit, the Bayut Big Broker Event. The solution helps buyers determine the availability and validity of a listing. In September 2019, Chris Hemsworth starred in a Bayut commercial. 

In April 2020, EMPG and the Netherlands-based OLX Group announced the merger of their operations in the UAE, Egypt, Lebanon, Saudi Arabia, Kuwait, Qatar, Bahrain, Pakistan and Oman, together with the OLX-owned Dubai-based classifieds website, Dubizzle.

In May 2020, EMPG further acquired Lamudi Global, with assets in the Philippines, Mexico and Indonesia.

In January 2022, Dubai Land Department signed a memorandum of understanding with Bayut to provide Dubai’s real estate market with interactive data and reports.

References

External links
 Official Site

Internet properties established in 2008
Real estate websites
Companies based in Dubai
Emirati websites
Emirati companies established in 2008
Real estate companies established in 2008